Hamza Hamzaoğlu (born 1 July 1970) is a Turkish professional football manager and former player.

Club career
Hamzaoğlu began his career in 1988 with İzmirspor. In 1995, he transferred to Galatasaray as captain and midfielder, where he won the league two times, the cup and Super Cup one time. He left the club after 4 years and later played for Siirtspor, İstanbulspor, Yozgatspor and Konyaspor, before ending his career at Beylerbeyi in 2004.

International career
Hamzaoğlu represented the Turkey U21 national team from 1991 until 1993, making 9 appearances in the process. He also made one appearance for the senior Turkey national team in 1993.

Managerial career
Hamzaoğlu began his managerial career with Konyaspor in 2004 as the club's caretaker manager, but it wasn't until 2008 that he signed a full-time contract with Malatyaspor. He left Malatyaspor the following year for Eyüpspor and managed Denizlispor a year later. In 2011, he was appointed at Akhisarspor, helping them achieve promotion to the Süper Lig by winning the club's first ever major trophy, the 2011–12 TFF First League. Hamzaoğlu also became the assistant of Fatih Terim in the Turkey national team the next year. 

On 28 November 2014, he was appointed as the new manager of Galatasaray on the same day Cesare Prandelli was released from his contract. He signed a five-month contract until the end of the season. Hamzaoğlu won the league and the cup in that season, and in the following the Super Cup. His contract got terminated on 18 November 2015. Hamzaoğlu was also awarded the Turkish Manager of the Year Award for the year 2015.

He then managed Bursaspor, Osmanlıspor, Antalyaspor and BB Erzurumspor. In November 2019, he became the new manager of Süper Lig club Gençlerbirliği.

Managerial statistics
Last updated 18 February 2022

Honours

Player
Galatasaray
Süper Lig: 1992–93, 1993–94
Turkish Cup: 1993
Turkish Super Cup: 1993

Konyaspor
TFF First League: 2002–03

Manager
Akhisarspor
TFF First League: 2011–12

Galatasaray
Süper Lig: 2014–15
Turkish Cup: 2014–15
Turkish Super Cup: 2015

Individual
Turkish Manager of the Year: 2015

References

External links

 

1970 births
Living people
Footballers from Komotini
Turkish footballers
Turkey international footballers
Turkey under-21 international footballers
Turkish football managers
Greek people of Turkish descent
TFF First League players
Süper Lig players
İzmirspor footballers
Galatasaray S.K. footballers
İstanbulspor footballers
Siirtspor footballers
Alanyaspor footballers
Yimpaş Yozgatspor footballers
Konyaspor footballers
Beylerbeyi S.K. footballers
Competitors at the 1991 Mediterranean Games
Mediterranean Games silver medalists for Turkey
Mediterranean Games medalists in football
Association football midfielders
Süper Lig managers
Malatyaspor managers
Eyüpspor managers
Denizlispor managers
Akhisarspor managers
Galatasaray S.K. (football) managers
Bursaspor managers
Ankaraspor managers
Antalyaspor managers
Gençlerbirliği S.K. managers
Kayserispor managers